Celine was the second concert residency by the Canadian singer Celine Dion. It was performed at the Colosseum at Caesars Palace in Las Vegas, Nevada, beginning 15 March 2011, with an estimated 70 performances per year. The residency ranked 26th in Pollstar's "Top 50 Worldwide Tour (Mid-Year)", earning over $20 million. Being seen by over 200,000 people, the residency became the number one show in 2011 (for North America). It made Dion the top earner in Vegas, earning $500,000 a show, and made her the "most profitable music act in Las Vegas" since Elvis Presley.

According to Pollstar end of year data (201113), the residency has grossed $116.5 million, playing to 726,346. In March 2013, Dion's manager and husband, René Angélil, announced that the residency contract had been extended to 2019. Due to a statement made by Dion and Caesars on 13 August 2014, all planned shows through 22 March 2015, had been cancelled due to Angelil's battle with throat cancer.
 
On 24 March 2015, it was announced that Dion would resume the residency on 27 August 2015 with new theatrical and musical elements, along with a brand new look and feel. Around the same time as the announcement of the return, Dion's management released a statement announcing the departure of the singer's longtime touring band members consisting of musical director Claude "Mego" Lemay, guitarist André Coutu, keyboardist Yves Frulla, bassist Marc Langis, and violinist Jean-Seb Carré. The new band members consist of musical director Scott Price, guitarist Kaven Girouard, bassist Yves Labonte, and violinist Phillippe Dunnigan (taking on the main violin solos). On 14 January 2016, Dion cancelled the rest of the January performances due to her husband's recent death from cancer. Dion later resumed the residency on 23 February to a sold-out crowd garnering rave reviews. Dion celebrated her 1000th Las Vegas show (overall) on 8 October 2016. The residency has been seen by more than two million spectators since its inception. The show concluded on 8 June 2019, as announced on 24 September 2018.

Background

On 15 March 2011, Dion began a three-year residency at the Colosseum at Caesars Palace. The new show features 31 musicians, consisting of a full orchestra and band. The residency was Directed and Produced by Ken Ehrlich with the creative production from Dion's long time Lighting Designer Yves Aucoin and Sound Mixer/Designer, Denis Savage. Moment Factory will be producing the visual elements for the residency (the company previously worked with Nine Inch Nails and DJ Tiesto). The residency does not contain the dancers and Cirque du Soleil style choreography seen in Dion's previous show at the Colosseum, A New Day.

Dion announced her Vegas comeback during an appearance on The Oprah Winfrey Show. Tickets went on sale that same week with extremely strong sales. The opening night show on 15 March was sold out within minutes. Rehearsals began on 17 January 2011, in Florida, and at the Colosseum starting on 17 February 2011 when Dion moved back to Vegas to begin preparations for the new show.

Additionally, it was reported in January 2011 that ticket sales for the residency had already passed the $10 million mark, marking the fastest sale in the history of the venue. Caesars Palace President, Gary Selesner stated that the first lot of shows through  17 April will be completely sold out.

Broadcasts and recordings

Several concerts have been professionally filmed for both television and promotional use. 
The premiere concert on 15 March 2011 was filmed in its entirety. Excerpts from this concert were shown in the documentary "Celine: 3 Boys and a New Show", which was broadcast in early October 2011 on the Oprah Winfrey Network, and also various advertisements for the residency.  The documentary included excerpts from rehearsals of "Open Arms", "Man In The Mirror", "Lullabye (Goodnight, My Angel)", "Declaration Of Love", "Love Can Move Mountains", "All By Myself", "It's All Coming Back to Me Now", "The Reason"
as well as from the premiere of:
"Open Arms", "Goldfinger", "(If You Can't Sing It) You'll Have to Swing It (Mr. Paganini)", "All By Myself", "River Deep, Mountain High", "My Heart Will Go On" and "How Do You Keep the Music Playing?", "The Reason", "Ne me quitte pas", The Power of Love", "At Seventeen", "Ben/Man in the Mirror".

"Open Arms" from the concert of 26 March, was broadcast on American Broadcasting Company during the 2011 MDA Show of Strength telethon on 4 September 2011.

On 19 June 2011, "Because You Loved Me" was broadcast at the 63rd Primetime Emmy Awards. The song was filmed 15 June.

On 15 January 2012, Dion held a special concert supporting "Play without Pain: Children's Sickle Cell Benefit." The entire concert was filmed and excerpts of "Open Arms" and "Lullabye (Goodnight, My Angel)" were shown in the behind the scenes video of the event. A 47-second excerpt of "My Heart Will Go On" from this concert was sold to various news outlets following Dion's sudden announcement that all future concerts would be cancelled in August 2014.

A live video of "My Heart Will Go On" was leaked on YouTube on 12 July 2012, and was officially released on 31 July. The footage in this video was filmed on  1, 2 and 3 July 2011 and shows Céline Dion performing inside a circular water curtain created by the French company Aquatique Show.

Dion's performance of "Loved Me Back to Life" on 30 December 2013 was filmed and was broadcast on Entertainment Tonight Canada during their New Year's Eve special on 31 December.

After her husband's death on 14 January 2016, Celine resumed her residency on 23 February 2016. A special video tribute as well as "With One More Look at You/Watch Closely Now" and "Where Does My Heart Beat Now" were live streamed on Facebook.  Later on, also an excerpt of "All By Myself" from that night was shown during various TV programmes as Celine struggled to finish the song.

On 23 May 2017, following a terror attack in Manchester, Celine paid homage to its victims. The tribute was streamed on her Facebook.

On 24 May 2017, the first live performance of "How Does a Moment Last Forever" was recorded and uploaded the following day on Celine's Facebook.

Following tragic hurricane season, on 20 September 2017, Celine's speech and excerpt of "Recovering" were released on Facebook encouraging people to donate money for the victims of the natural disaster.

Following Vegas mass shooting, Celine decided to continue her residency and resumed performing two days after the events. She opened the residency with a speech that was streamed online. Celine paid tribute to the victims and donated all the proceeds from this show to the victims' families.

On 31 December 2017, a short via satellite interview and an excerpt of "Because You Loved Me" were shown on CNN's New Year's Eve Live with Anderson Cooper and Andy Cohen. Moreover, Fox's New Year's Eve with Steve Harvey showed "River Deep, Mountain High". However, this performance was prerecorded on 25 November 2017 when Dion did not change the costumes throughout the whole show as she was wearing a corset after having cancelled the previous show because of lower back spasms.

On 22 May 2018, the first live performance of "Ashes" was recorded and an excerpt was shared the following day on Celine's Facebook. Another excerpt of the song was posted on 10 February 2019 on the occasion of the Grammy nomination for the Deadpool 2 Soundtrack.

On 7 June 2019, the first live performance of “Flying On My Own” was recorded and shared the following day by Céline's team.

Critical reception
The residency received many positive reviews from music critics. USA Today wrote, "Dion isn't here to perform. She's here to kill it. Again… she isn't aiming for applause. She's looking for rapture." Las Vegas Sun wrote, "A magnificent masterpiece! Celine has single-handedly redefined class and elegance in onstage performances. Her voice is sent from the angels." The Montreal Gazette wrote, "Dion magnificent in new Las Vegas show. One hell of a show!...Jaw-dropping... Grandiose, yet intimate…Pure entertainment of the highest order. Worth every penny!"  Richard Ouzounian of the Toronto Star headlined his article as, "Celine Dion's Vegas show more spectacular than ever," and claimed, "If her last show sold out for five years, this one should make it for ten."

Pollstar data
At the end of 2011, Pollstar announced that Celine was #10 on their Top 25 North American Tours gross of $41.2 million.

At the end of 2012, Pollstar announced that Celine was #29 on their Top 50 Worldwide Tours with a gross of $36.5 million.

At the end of 2013, Pollstar announced that Celine was #23 on their Top 25 North American Tours list with a gross of $38.8 million and #25 on their Worldwide Tours (this included the number from the Sans attendre Tour.)

Pollstar announced during their 2014 Mid Year Tour Gross that Celine was #7 on their Top 100 North American Tours List and number 28 on the Top 100 Worldwide tours list with a gross of $21.1 million.

Celine was #47 on the Top 100 American tour List and #77 on the Worldwide Grosses in 2015 with a total gross of $22.6 million, lower than previous years due to taking a year off to look after her sick husband.

Celine was #10 on the 2016 Year End Top 100 Worldwide Tours with a total gross of $85.5 million. She is #14 on the 2016 Year End Top 200 North American Tours with a total gross of $61.1 million.

Celine was #11 on the 2017 Year End Top 20 Worldwide Tours with a total gross of $101.2 million. She is the highest grossing female artist of 2017.

Celine was #15 on the 2018 billboard's year-end boxscore charts with a total gross of $76.5 million.

Set list 

 
Notes:

 An interlude of "Declaration of Love" was cut at the beginning of 2012 
 Song for You was performed during NYE 2012 
On select dates (winter runs 2011–2013), "Overjoyed" was replaced by "The Prayer" (virtual duet with Andrea Bocelli) 
 "Ne me quitte pas" was replaced by "S'il suffisait d'aimer" from 17 June 2014 until 4 July 2014 probably due to Rene's illness 
 On 29 July 2014, Dion did not perform any French song 
 "All The Way" (virtual duet with Frank Sinatra) was performed during the first three shows in August 2015 return 
 An interlude of "Unison" was performed until 2 September 2015 
 "If I Can Dream" initially was performed live as a virtual duet with Elvis Presley, later performed as an interlude video performance (since 8 September 2015) to be finally cut in Spring 2016  
 On 31 December 2015, Adele's hit, "Hello" was performed 
 Immortality was originally a duet version with a hologram version of Dion on stage and Celine going through the audience. Later on, the virtual duet was cut and Celine sang the whole song while walking down the aisle. From Spring 2016, she started singing the song standing on stage. According to fan posts on some message boards of the singer, Dion stopped going down the aisle due to audience members pushing, fighting, and racing up towards the aisle trying to get photographs with her. The song was totally cut on 24 May 2017 
 "Recovering", song written by Pink, premiered on 20 September 2016 
 "How Does a Moment Last Forever", a new Beauty And The Beast theme song, premiered on 24 May 2017 
 "Ashes", a new Deadpool 2 song, premiered on 22 May 2018 
 The intro video including "I Drove All Night" was cut on 22 May 2018, meaning there is no intro video prior the opening song. However, Celine started performing "I Drove All Night"  later during the show. 
 On 8 and 9 June 2018 Dion completely changed the setlist in order to rehearse for her Live 2018 tour. 
 On 7 June 2019, Celine premiered a brand new English single "Flying on my own" from her upcoming album, Courage. 
 On 8 June 2019, “Over the Rainbow” was performed for the first time in three years. Additionally, it included a photo collage with pictures from Celine's both residencies in Las Vegas, spanning between 2002 - 2019.

 
Between 2011 and 2015 permanent changes included only one moment in the show: Michael Jackson's medley > "Rolling in the Deep" > "Loved Me Back to Life" > "Incredible"

The biggest change, and the so-called revamped show, premiered after a year-long hiatus in August 2015 with 40-50% changes to the original setlist. 10 songs were cut, whereas 13 were added.

Between 2015 and June 2018, once again, the show saw mostly cosmetic changes (changing the order of songs rather than adding/cutting songs). The biggest changes included: 
  
- cutting "All The Way", "Unison", "If I Can Dream", "The First Time Ever I Saw Your Face", "Over the Rainbow", "Incredible", "Immortality" and "I'm Your Angel"

- adding "Recovering", "Ashes" and "I Drove All Night"

- adding and later cutting "How Does a Moment Last Forever", "Think Twice"

The show also included a considerable amount of covers. As of October 2018, 25 covers have been performed.

In June 2018 Dion completely changed the setlist in order to rehearse for her Live 2018 tour. Surprisingly, in October 2018 Dion did not come back to the original Las Vegas show setlist but kept the final tour setlist with a few changes. "Think Twice", "Falling Into You" and "The Reason" have been cut.

Both Spring 2017 and 2018 had the shortest setlist ever with 20 songs in total and only 9 songs sung in full. Other songs were either shortened or part of a medley.

Opening video

- 15 March 2011 – 29 July 2014 - intro video included a retrospection which included footage from final show of A New Day, Taking Chances World Tour, birth of Celine's twins, rehearsals for the new show as well as coming back to Las Vegas. Thus, it shows Celine's life between 2007 and 2011.

- 27 August 2015 – 7 October 2016 - a video montage was created with fans from all over the world who were dancing and singing along to "I Drove All Night"

- 23 February 2016 – 12 March 2016 - "Tribute to René Angélil" served as the intro video

- 8 October 2016 – 12 January 2018 - in order to commemorate the 1000th show a new video with "I Drove All Night" in the background was created. It showed the evolution of Celine's Las Vegas shows since 2003

- 22 May 2018 to 5 June 2019: There was no opening video.

- 7 and 8 June 2019: A video entitled “Ciao for now Las Vegas” was shown before the show.

Shows

Cancelled shows

Band 

 Musical Director, Piano: Claude "Mégo" Lemay (2011-2014), Scott Price (2015-2019)
 Drums: Dominique Messier
 Bass: Marc Langis (2011-2014), Yves Labonté (2015-2019)
 Guitars: André Coutu (2011-2014), Kaven Girouard (2015-2019)
 Keyboards: Yves Frulla (2011-2014), Guillaume Marchand (2015-2019)
 Percussion: Paul Picard 
 Background Vocals & Tin Whistle: Élise Duguay
 Background Vocals: Barnev Valsaint, Dawn Cumberbatch
 Violins: Jean Sebastien Carré (2011-2014), Philippe Dunnigan, Jenny Elfving, Laraine Kaizer, Rebecca Ramsey, Svetlin Belneev, Lisa Dondlinger, Lenka Hajkova, John Arnold, De Ann Letourneau
 Violas: Jerome Gordon, Kaila Potts, Dmitri Kourka, 
 Cello: Lindsey Springer, Raymond Sicam III, Irina Chirkova, Judy Kang, Élise Duguay
 Woodwinds: Eric Tewalt, Philip Wigfall
 Trumpets: Daniel Falcone,Matt Fronke, Kurt Evanson, Nico Edgerman, Donald Lorice
 Trombones:Nathan Tanouye

References

External links

Dion's official website

Concert residencies in the Las Vegas Valley
2011 concert residencies
2012 concert residencies
2013 concert residencies
2014 concert residencies
2015 concert residencies
2016 concert residencies
2017 concert residencies
2018 concert residencies
2019 concert residencies
Celine Dion concert residencies
Caesars Palace